David Gasser (born October 7, 1942) is an American-born Canadian football player who played for the Edmonton Eskimos where he wore jersey uniform number 65. He previously played football at West Texas State University. He later worked as a police officer in Larkspur, California.  Thereafter he was employed as an Inspector for the Marin County District Attorney’s Office until his retirement.

References

1940s births
Living people
Edmonton Elks players